Saira Shahliani is a Pakistani politician who had been a Member of the Provincial Assembly of Sindh, from June 2013 to May 2018. Previously she had been a Member of the Provincial Assembly of Sindh from 2002 to 2007 and again from 2012 to 2013.

Early life and education
She was born on 6 July 1976 in Jacobabad.

She has earned the degree of Bachelor of Arts from the Government Degree College, Quetta and completed a Master of Arts in English from the University of Balochistan.

Political career
She was elected to the Provincial Assembly of Sindh as a candidate of Pakistan Peoples Party (PPP) on a reserved seat for women in 2002 Pakistani general election.

She was re-elected to the Provincial Assembly of Sindh as a candidate of PPP on a reserved seat for women in August 2012 after Shazia Marri resigned from the seat.

She was re-elected to the Provincial Assembly of Sindh as a candidate of PPP on a reserved seat for women in 2013 Pakistani general election.

References

Living people
Sindh MPAs 2013–2018
1976 births
Pakistan People's Party MPAs (Sindh)
Sindh MPAs 2002–2007
Sindh MPAs 2008–2013
21st-century Pakistani women politicians
 People from Jacobabad District